Tremona was a municipality in the district of Mendrisio in the canton of Ticino in Switzerland.

On 5 April 2009  the municipalities of Arzo, Capolago, Genestrerio, Mendrisio, Rancate and Tremona merged into the municipality of Mendrisio.

References

Former municipalities of Ticino
Villages in the Mendrisio District